Ice Spice (born 2000) is an American rapper.

Ice Spice may also refer to:

 "Ice Spice", a single by NLE Choppa 
 "Ice Spice", a song by BabyTron from the 2023 EP Out on Bond

See also